
Mosby may refer to:

Places
 Mosby, Missouri, a city in Clay County, Missouri, United States
 Mosby, Montana, an unincorporated community in southwestern Garfield County, Montana, United States
 Mosby Tavern, a 1740 historical building in Powhatan County, Virginia, also known as "Littleberry Mosby House" or "Old Cumberland Courthouse"
 Mosby, Norway, a village and district in Kristiansand municipality in Vest-Agder county, Norway
 Mosby Creek (disambiguation), a list of places called Mosby Creek

People
 Arron Mosby (born 1999), American football player
 Bernice Mosby (b. 1984), a basketball player in the WNBA
 Curtis Mosby (1888–1957), an American jazz drummer, bandleader, and businessman
 Ervine Mosby, an English rugby league footballer who played in the 1900s
 Harold Mosby (1926–2007), an English footballer
 Howard Mosby (b. 1961), an African American member of the Georgia House of Representatives
 John R. Mosby, guerrilla leader during the Magonista rebellion of 1911
 John S. Mosby (1833–1916), Confederate partisan ranger in the American Civil War, leader of "Mosby's Rangers"
 Johnny and Jonie Mosby, a country music duo
 Littleberry Mosby Jr (1757–1821), United States brigadier general during the War of 1812
 Marilyn Mosby (b. 1980), an American lawyer
 Ted Mosby, a fictional character from the television show, How I Met Your Mother
 William H. Mosby (1898–1964), a portrait artist and an important American teacher of fine arts

Businesses
 Mosby (publisher), American medical publishing firm absorbed by Elsevier; its name survives as an Elsevier imprint name

See also
 Moseby, a surname